Towne Crier Cafe is a club and restaurant located in Beacon, NY. It was established in 1972. The restaurant offers a brunch menu, dinner menu or dessert menu, depending on the time of day. The restaurant is accompanied by live music, and seats approximately 100 guests. The intimate venue seats 170 guests. It was founded in 1972 by Phil Ciganer. After a period of decline, it has enjoyed increased popularity in recent years.

History

Founder Phil Ciganer discovered the first location for the club while delivering a piece of art to a friend in the Town of Beekman, Dutchess County, NY.

“It was an interesting, charming little setting,” he recalls. Part of the building dated back to the 1600s and had once been a stagecoach stop and post office. By 1972 the new enterprise, appropriately called the Towne Crier Cafe, was up and running.

Ciganer liked the idea of being a “proving ground” for local talent but also brought in well-known musicians such as Leon Redbone, Odetta, Dave Van Ronk, Richie Havens, Dr. John, Taj Mahal and John Hammond.

Issues with the building and insufficient parking prompted Ciganer to seek a new location. After 16 years in Beekman, The Towne Crier moving to Pawling in 1988.

Though not as historically interesting as its predecessor, the Pawling location accommodated more people and offered expanded dining facilities. Decorated inside and out with a Southwestern motif, the club sported a stage set into a corner of an open, tiered room furnished with tables and chairs. The enclosed bar adjacent to this area was decorated with photos of the many artists who performed at the Towne Crier.

Situated on the Route 22 corridor along a major commuter route, the Pawling venue was frequented by many New York City-based musicians such as Jimmy Vivino, Sid McGinnis, Paul Shaeffer.

Eventually, Ciganer's ambitions outgrew the Pawling location and the club relocated to Beacon, New York, which has enjoyed a cultural "rebirth" in recent years. Ciganer cites this cultural renaissance as the main factor in choosing to relocate the Towne Crier Cafe to Beacon.

Notable performers

The diverse roster of artists who have graced its stage include Pete Seeger, John Renbourn, Richie Havens, Suzanne Vega, Jack Hardy, Richard Thompson, Jorma Kaukonen, Altan, the Flying Karamazov Brothers, Leo Kottke, Adrian Legg, Billy McLaughlin, Preston Reed, Clifton Chenier, Odetta, Dr. John, Southside Johnny, Ani DiFranco, Black Violin, Taj Mahal, John Hammond, Bela Fleck, Gandalf Murphy Cherish the Ladies, Battlefield Band, Fairport Convention, Wishbone Ash, Bill Miller and many others.

References

External links 
 Official Website

Beacon, New York
1972 establishments in New York (state)
Restaurants established in 1972
Restaurants in New York (state)